Peter Olof Gradin (born December 9, 1958) is an ice hockey player who played for the Swedish national team. He won a bronze medal at the 1984 Winter Olympics. He played his career mostly with AIK Ishockey and he won three Swedish championships for the team in 1978, 1982 and 1985. He also won a bronze medal for Sweden in the 1979 World Championships.

Career statistics

Regular season and playoffs

International

References 

1958 births
Living people
Ice hockey players at the 1984 Winter Olympics
Olympic bronze medalists for Sweden
Olympic ice hockey players of Sweden
Olympic medalists in ice hockey
Medalists at the 1984 Winter Olympics
AIK IF players
Modo Hockey players